Eastern Suburbs DRLFC may refer to:
Eastern Suburbs District Rugby League Football Club, the former name of the Eastern Suburbs Tigers of Brisbane.
Eastern Suburbs District Rugby League Football Club, the former name of the Sydney Roosters.